Sister Mary Theresa Martin (1881-1929) was an Australian nurse. During World War I she served in the 2nd Australian General Hospital, Nursing Service, which was part of the Australian General Hospital.

Life
Mary Theresa Martin was born in 1881 in Rockhampton in Queensland, Australia. She trained as a nurse and subsequently joined the staff of the Royal Newcastle Hospital. On the outbreak of World War I she signed up for active service abroad and was assigned to the 2nd Australian General Hospital. She sailed from Sydney on 28 November 1914 on Transport A55 Kyarra on 28 November 1914. After the war ended she returned to Australia on 9 November 1918. She found employment at the Prince of Wales Hospital, Sydney, where she worked for the next ten years.

Mary Martin's life was probably no different from numerous others who joined and served in the Armed Forces in WWI. However, through one small incident – a memorable visit to the Great Pyramid of Giza – she left her name to posterity.

Visit to Pyramids

Whilst in Egypt with thousands of other Australian troops waiting to be deployed, Mary Martin visited the Great Pyramid of Giza and painted her name on the wall inside Campbell's Chamber, the uppermost of four chambers directly above the King's Chamber. The inscription, or rather graffiti, reads "SISTER M. MARTIN 2nd. GEN. HOSP 6.2.15" indicating that she visited the pyramid on 6 February 1915. This date is consistent with the deployment of Australian troops (for example the 11th Battalion) who trained in Egypt before being sent into action.

Death
She died on 23 October 1929. She was interred in the Roman Catholic portion of the Botany Bay cemetery within the Eastern Suburbs Memorial Park.

References

1881 births
1929 deaths
Australian women of World War I
Female nurses in World War I
Australian military nurses
Australian women nurses
Burials at Eastern Suburbs Memorial Park
Great Pyramid of Giza